Robert Kirk Lowdermilk (born April 10, 1963) is a former American football center who played twelve seasons (178 games) in the National Football League (NFL), with the Minnesota Vikings and Indianapolis Colts. He attended Salem High School and The Ohio State University. According to Lowdermilk's 1988 NFL player trading card, he was the youngest starting center in 1987.

His son John Lowdermilk also played in the NFL briefly.

Lowdermilk resides in Carrollton, Ohio.

References 

1963 births
Living people
Players of American football from Canton, Ohio
American football centers
Ohio State Buckeyes football players
Minnesota Vikings players
Indianapolis Colts players
People from Carrollton, Ohio